Usama Hasan is a British astronomer and former academic. He is a former senior lecturer in business information systems at Middlesex University, and a Fellow of the Royal Astronomical Society. He was also a senior researcher in Islamic Studies at the Quilliam Foundation until it was closed down in April 2021.

Hasan has previously argued in favour of a compatibility between Islam and human evolution, arguing the mention of Adam and Eve in the Quran is purely symbolic.

Family
His father, Suhaib Hasan, is a Saudi Arabia-trained Islamic scholar who considers himself Ahl-i Hadith and Salafi, while his grandfather, Abdul-Ghaffar Hasan Al-Hindi (d. 2007), was a scholar as well, having taught at the Islamic University of Medina at the request of the influential Salafi scholar Al-Albani.

Career
He has stated that he fought in Afghanistan against the Soviet occupation.

Hasan was a member of the United Kingdom's Foreign and Commonwealth Office's Projecting British Muslims delegations to Egypt in 2008 and to Afghanistan (Helmand) in 2010, was a Keynote Speaker at the Anglo-Syrian government-sponsored conference "The Message of Peace in Islam" in Damascus in 2009, and is a Patron of both the Forum for the Discussion of Israel and Palestine (FODIP) and Friends of the Bereaved Families Forum. Usama was also a speaker at the Google Ideas/Council on Foreign Relations Summit Against Violent Extremism (Dublin, 2011).

He is Senior Researcher at the Quilliam Foundation. He has appeared on television programmes, including BBC Hardtalk, CNN, and has also written various columns for The Guardian and The Washington Post.

Controversies

Evolution controversy
Hasan has argued that Islam is compatible with the theory of evolution, describing the story of Adam and Eve as "children's madrasa-level understanding" of human origins while pointing to antecedents of the modern theory of evolution among medieval Muslim philosophers like Ibn Khaldun (d.1406) and Ibn Miskawayh (d.1030). His lectures have been disrupted by hecklers and has reportedly received death threats.

Hasan later retracted some of his views on evolution. Several British Muslim writers, including Inayat Bunglawala and Yahya Birt, backed his right to free speech. On 5 January 2013, he was featured in a debate against Yasir Qadhi titled Have Muslims Misunderstood Evolution?, in which he argued in favor of human evolution.

Power struggles at the Masjid al-Tawhid
Hasan has complained about "extremism" at the London Masjid al-Tawhid mosque and in May 2012, as part of the arbitration process, he and all other trustees voluntarily stepped down from their positions as Trustees of the masjid. In June 2012, the new Trustees of the Trust changed the locks of the Mosque doors and employed security guards. According to the website of the Masjid al-Tawhid, the Hasan family "want to ... regain personal control of the mosque".

Al-Shabaab video threat
In October 2013 Hasan was alerted by anti-terrorist police that he and other Muslim figures in the UK who had spoken out against Islamist extremism had been targeted by a propaganda video created by Al-Shabaab, the terrorist group responsible for the attack on the Westgate shopping mall in Kenya.

Views

Fatwa against ISIS
In 2014 he and others issued a fatwa condemning British Muslims fighting for the "oppressive and tyrannical" Islamic State of Iraq and the Levant. Their fatwa "religiously prohibites" would-be British jihadists from joining the Islamic State and orders all Muslims to oppose ISIL's "poisonous ideology".

Summer fasting times
Usama believes that Muslims in the UK should fast shorter hours – rather than the dawn-to-sunset hours that most Muslims do – as summer days at such latitudes can run for up to 19 hours.

See also

References

External links

 Usama Hasan's articles at on the Guardian website
 Unity - Blog by Usama Hasan

English Muslims
English religious writers
English people of Pakistani descent
Fellows of the Royal Astronomical Society
Living people
Academics of Middlesex University
Theistic evolutionists
Year of birth missing (living people)